Lowlakan (also Romanized as Lowlakān) is a village in Dasht-e Bil Rural District, in the Central District of Oshnavieh County, West Azerbaijan Province, Iran. At the 2006 census, its population was 770, in 162 families.

References 

Populated places in Oshnavieh County